"Star" is New Zealand band Stellar's ninth single, and their third single from their second album Magic Line. This single is the last of the band's to have a physical release. The single, though charting for five weeks would only reach a position of #40. The single featured two B-sides, the Sub Mariner Remix of Taken, as well as the new B-side We Go Out. This song would later be featured on the soundtrack to the New Zealand horror film The Locals in 2003. Furthermore. after five minutes of silence the single would feature some bonus material. The first bonus sound clip was of the song We Go Out being read by a speech synthesiser and the other being a short James Bond take-of, where Andrew Maclaren played the role of James Bond and Kurt Shanks the speaking role of Miss Moneypenny.

Track listing

References

2001 songs
2002 singles
Songs written by Boh Runga
Stellar (New Zealand band) songs